Statistics of the Football Tournament in the 1902–1903 season.

Overview
It was contested by five teams, and Kjøbenhavns Boldklub won the championship.

League standings

References
Denmark - List of final tables (RSSSF)

1902–03 in Danish football
Top level Danish football league seasons
The Football Tournament seasons
Denmark